The International Peace Institute (IPI, formerly the International Peace Academy) is an independent non-profit lobby group based in New York (beside the headquarters of the United Nations, with which IPI works closely). The institute has regional offices in Europe (Vienna, Austria), and in the Middle East (Manama, Bahrain).

IPI specializes in multilateral approaches to peace and security issues, working closely with the Secretariat and membership of the United Nations. IPI's primary objective is to promote effective international responses to new and emerging issues and crises through research, analysis, and policy development.

History 

The International Peace Institute was created with support from UN Secretary-General U Thant in 1970, originally with the purpose of studying UN peacekeeping and developing peacekeeping doctrine, with strong financial backing from Ruth Forbes Paine Young .

Its first President was Maj. Gen. Indar Jit Rikhye,  Indian commanding officer of UN peacekeeping forces and a former military advisor to the UN Secretary-General.  Under his tenure, IPI initiated an innovative program aimed at training civilians and military officers together for the challenges of preventing conflict and building peace. In 1990, under Olara Otunnu, a Ugandan diplomat and politician, IPI  branched out into the political dimensions of war and peace.  During this time, IPI became known for its case studies of UN field operations and for its forward-looking analysis on new roles for the UN in the security sphere.  Otunnu also initiated IPI's Africa Program,  currently its longest-running program.

The next IPI President, in 1998, was David M. Malone, a Canadian scholar-diplomat.  Malone took IPI more deeply into the realm both of scholarship and of policy advocacy, focused in part on the work of the UN Security Council.  IPI broke new ground on the economics of war, on links between the causes of conflict and conflict prevention, the nexus of security and development and on new forms of international governance, such as transitional administration.  It became a source of expertise for the media in which Malone and his IPI colleagues published frequent opinion and analytical pieces.

From 2005 to 2020, IPI was led by Terje Rød-Larsen, a principal architect of the 1990s Oslo Peace Accords (between the PLO and the Government of Israel) and a Norwegian sociologist and diplomat who has served the UN as its senior envoy in the Middle East.

IPI today focuses its work on crisis and the response capacity of international institutions, UN reform, state-building/peace-building, and has specific regional programs on the Middle East, Africa, and Asia. Offices are currently located in Manama, the Kingdom of Bahrain (MENA), New York, and Vienna.

Activities

General
The IPI works in Africa, the Middle East, Europe, and Central Asia that involves interacting with international diplomats, dignitaries and scholars (especially from the United Nations) to achieve its goals . These include direct consultation with diplomats and officials, conducting research and publishing reports, convening discussions and presentations, and encouraging and facilitating diplomatic activities of others.

The IPI has convened "high-level" discussion panels made up of international diplomats, dignitaries and scholars (especially from the United Nations) to discuss major issues in international affairs affecting international peace and security.

The organization publishes a wide range of reports relating to international diplomacy, peacekeeping and humanitarian responses to crisis.

Vienna Seminar
The International Peace Institute (IPI) Vienna Seminar on Peacemaking and Peacekeeping is an annual event, held in Vienna, Austria since 1970. Over the years it has become a widely recognized forum for discussion of peace and security issues, addressed in a broad sense. It operates with additional support from the Austrian and Viennese governments, and the Diplomatic Academy of Vienna. The event includes presentations by major international diplomats and political officials.

Funding 
In 2020 Verdens Gang wrote that IPI has received 130 million Norwegian kroner "through the years", from the Norwegian Foreign Ministry. The Jeffrey Epstein VI Foundation donated 375,000 dollars in 2012.

According to the IPI website, the organisation is funded by governments, philanthropic foundations, and individuals. Roughly 70% of annual funds are from government donors, and 22% of our funds are from philanthropic foundations. The remaining funds come from corporate sponsors, individuals, and our board members.

In 2020-2021 financial statements IPI declared US$10,311,911 in assets.

Officers 

 Kevin Rudd- The Chairman of the board of directors. Former Prime Minister & Labor Party leader, Australia
 Adam Lupel
 Mortimer Zuckerman- Chairman Emeritus
 Cliff Perlman- Attorney at Law
 Ann Phillips - Senior Advisor, Inclusive Peace Processes, United States Institute of Peace; Member of the Board, World Policy Institute, Member of the advisory board, Council on Global Initiatives of the New School
 Jean Todt - President, Federation Internationale de L’Automobile
 Brigitte Wertheimer- President, Project Peace by Tourism

Former officers
 António Guterres- Honorary Chair (Secretary-General of the United Nations). He resigned from IPI in October 2020.

Notable individuals 

Rita Hauser, Former Chairman of the board of directors. An international law attorney, diplomat and philanthropist, who served as a U.S. diplomat to the United Nations for the administration of President Nixon, and subsequent intelligence advisor to the administrations of Presidents George W. Bush and Barack Obama.
 Terje Rød-Larsen, former president of the foundation, and a Norwegian diplomat. He resigned in 2020.
Mortimer Benjamin Zuckerman. Former Vice Chairman, Secretary & Treasurer:   (Owner, Editor-in-Chief & Publisher of the New York Daily News newspaper and U.S. News & World Report magazine; Chairman-Emeritus, Boston Properties, Inc.
Eward C. Luck, Former Senior Vice President, Director of Studies and historian: E (Special Adviser to the UN Secretary-General), informal adviser to United Nations Secretary General Ban Ki-Moon.
Elizabeth Malory Cousens. Former Vice President (2005 to 2007): (later  Chief of Staff to the United Nations Mission in Nepal (2007-2008), and subsequently Principal Policy Advisor and Counselor to the U.S. Permanent Representative to the United Nations).
John Hirsch, senior adviser; former U.S. Ambassador to Sierra Leone.
Warren Hoge, senior adviser for external relations.
 Abdulla Al-Hajjri; former Yemeni Ambassador to the U.S.
 Turki bin Faisal Al Saud, member of International Advisory Council. A former ambassador to the United Kingdom and the United States.

References

External links
 
 
 Guidestar review profile

Peace organizations based in the United States
Organizations established in 1970
1970 establishments in New York City